is a Japanese light novel series written by Fuminori Teshima and illustrated by COMTA. The first volume of the light novel was published in February 2017 by Hobby Japan under their HJ Bunko imprint. Sixteen volumes have been released as of November 2022. A manga adaptation with art by Hako Itagaki has been serialized via Hobby Japan's Comic Fire website since February 2018. Both the light novel and manga have been licensed in North America by J-Novel Club. An anime adaptation has been announced.

Media

Light novels 
Hobby Japan published the first light novel volume in print with illustrations by COMTA on February 1, 2017. As of November 1, 2022, sixteen volumes have been published. The light novel is licensed in North America by J-Novel Club.

Manga 
A manga adaptation illustrated by Hako Itagaki began serialization in Hobby Japan's Comic Fire website in February 2018. The series has been collected in nine volumes as of November 1, 2022. The manga is also licensed by J-Novel Club.

A spin-off manga by Momo Futaba titled  began serialization in the same website in December 2021. The series has been collected in a single volume as of November 1, 2022.

Anime 
An anime adaptation was announced on October 27, 2022.

Reception 
In 2020, the manga adaptation was nominated for the Next Manga Award in the web category.

See also 
Campfire Cooking in Another World with My Absurd Skill, the spin-off manga series of which is illustrated by Momo Futaba

References

External links 
 Light novel official website (in Japanese)
 Manga official website (in Japanese)
 

2017 Japanese novels
Anime and manga based on light novels
Demons in anime and manga
Elves in popular culture
Fantasy anime and manga
HJ Bunko
Hobby Japan manga
J-Novel Club books
Japanese fantasy novels
Japanese webcomics
Light novels
Romantic comedy anime and manga
Shōnen manga
Webcomics in print